Zarah Maillard (born in Manila, Philippines) professionally known as Zarah (stylized as ZARAH) is an American writer, television personality, producer and recording artist. Zarah wrote her first murder mystery thriller novel Diamonds are For Cocktails (2022) based in the French Riviera.

Her earlier work includes performing with the rock band Goo Goo Dolls as a musician. She later hosted a music-based teen show B InTune TV broadcasting in 120 million television homes in the United States with broadcast affiliates of 54 countries worldwide including Canada, Europe and Asia. Zarah is a mix of Filipino, Spaniard and Chinese.

Early life

Zarah was born in Manila and raised in Los Angeles. She grew up in a large household with her family and was sent to an all-girl private school early on. Her mother was a housewife and entrepreneur for most of her marriage and her father, a freelancer she occasionally saw as a child and was seldom around for the family.

Growing up, Zarah was an avid daydreamer. She would often go out to their house garden and let her creativity flow, singing or imagining things to entertain herself. Her Roman Catholic upbringing provided disciplined and structured surroundings during her younger days and wrote her first lyrics at the tender age of fourteen.

Zarah spoke about her fascination with the wealthy people and their enticing lifestyle and the inescapable life lesson that accompanies it, which later became one of the dominating themes in her novel Diamonds Are for Cocktails (2022).

Television career

B InTune TV (TV series)

Zarah is best known for her role as the host of B InTune TV, a nationally syndicated daytime television show that teaches and entertains kids between the ages of 13 to 18 years old, which premiered in September 10, 2005 on Viacom and CBS Television Group and UPN Network stations.

Her involvement with non-profits like the Grammy Foundation that supports music and arts education for children was a perfect blend for her to use music as a tool to help educate while entertain teens simultaneously as a musician. Zarah is the co-executive producer of B InTune TV alongside creator and executive producer Eugene Charles Maillard and also the contributing writer of the show for eight seasons.

During her interview, she once told Charley Daniels of the Television Week Magazine, "I think music has healed a lot of my past."

In 2007, Zarah covered an hour-long television special in B InTune TV introducing the classic rock band Led Zeppelin and their history and accomplishments  in light of their reunion at the O2 Arena in London.

B InTune TV reached 120 million homes in the United States and had a growth of 54 other countries worldwide. Zarah attended B InTune TV’s red carpet event at the Viper Room in Hollywood commemorating its success.

She featured guest appearances of Rihanna, Justin Timberlake, Beyoncé, Jared Leto, Clint Eastwood and the Rolling Stones just to name a few. The show was supported by B InTune TV's industry partners like Warner Bros. Records and Where Music Meets Film at the Sundance Film Festival in Park City, Utah and other record labels like Universal Records and Capitol Records.

Other guest appearances

Other television shows

Zarah appeared as an actress in other popular television shows.

Music career

Influences and style

Zarah was influenced by classic to modern rock bands and other popular music growing up.  She worked with vocal coach Seth Riggs in Hollywood and began to write her own songs.

Since then, she collaborated with bassist Ricky Phillips of Bad English (now a Styx member), lead guitarist Howard Leese from Heart, and on various music-related projects with the Goo Goo Dolls and others.

Performances

Goo Goo Dolls

Zarah's notable performances include concert shows with the Goo Goo Dolls across the country. Her first show with the band took place at the 9:30 Club concert venue in Washington, D.C. known for its gold standard for rock clubs. Subsequently, Zarah met with members of the United States Congress which included former United States Senator John Breaux at the Capitol Hill with John Rzeznik lobbying on issues like music piracy which was prevalent in the music industry. She later performed with the Goo Goo Dolls in other locations like Los Angeles, CA.

In 2006, Zarah featured the Goo Goo Dolls in B InTune TV as her guest stars following them behind the scenes on how to launch a major rock concert for a television segment. She conducted many interviews with the band and crew members during rehearsal for their upcoming tour.

Fundraising events and projects

Zarah worked with Congressional leaders and former United States Senator like Tom Daschle, United States Senator Harry Reid and United States Congressman Steny Hoyer. She performed with her band during their fundraising events.

Zarah also worked on a children’s project  with rock band U2 in association with the Grammy Foundation where selected local high schools were invited to join in during soundcheck and she spent time with Bono and bassist Adam Clayton in one of their concert tours. In her interview, she expressed how "being able to help educate and entertain teens both at the same time is very powerful."

Album soft-launch

In late 2008, Zarah recorded with diverse musicians like bassist Chris Chaney of the alternative band Jane’s Addiction and keyboardist Alex Alessandroni among others on tracks she wrote and produced at the Henson Recording Studios [formerly A & M Studios] in Hollywood, California. The record was engineered by Julian Chan and Mix engineer by engineer Mark Needham.

By 2009, Zarah soft-launched her record  performing live with guitarist and producer Devin Bronson and invited a few aspiring young musicians to attend. Adam Gaynor, a former member of rock band Matchbox 20 hosted and introduced her at the show. Fender and Where Music Meets Film at the Sundance Film Festival were among those who sponsored the jam-packed event.

Writing career

Prior to her novel, Zarah was credited as a contributing writer of B InTune TV for eight seasons. She wrote the mystery thriller Diamonds are For Cocktails (2022) that included true to life characters such as H.S.H. Prince Albert II, the  reigning monarch of the Principality of Monaco where it mostly takes place and renowned French chef Paul Bocuse and memories of British actor Sir Roger Moore.

Diamonds Are for Cocktails was inspired by the French Riviera's  beauty and elegance but mainly the decadence of the 'rich and famous' lifestyle while mysteries unravel along the way that reflected many of her influences from her upbringing to her travel experiences. The story centers on the adopted French diamond heiress Camille Rogers in Monaco jet-setting around the globe yet struggles to make sense of her life. Her close friend and confidant she grew up with James Hughes becomes her lifelong companion offering support throughout her journey that details the themes of betrayal, love, physical and psychological abuse, violence and human interest.

Awards and recognition

Zarah is an advocate for music and arts education for youth and has inspired teens through edutainment and was recognized for her work. She has supported a variety of projects for children lending her skills and talents in all aspects of her music and television career  and continues to dedicate herself towards similar causes.

Entrepreneurship

In 2011, Zarah designed her first couture gown she wore at the 53rd Annual Grammy Awards. Her evening ensemble was covered in many Grammy red carpet arrival articles that included Los Angeles Times, Chicago Tribune and many other celebrity-driven news such as Life and MSN.

References

External links

Zarah at Official Zarah Website

Living people
American women novelists
21st-century American non-fiction writers
21st-century American novelists
21st-century American women writers
American crime writers
American mystery novelists
American thriller writers
American women screenwriters
Women mystery writers
Women thriller writers
21st-century American screenwriters
American thriller television series
Television personalities from Los Angeles
American women television personalities
Television producers from California
American women singer-songwriters
American rock singers
American pop rock singers
American musicians of Filipino descent
Filipino emigrants to the United States
American television writers
American television actresses
Actresses from Los Angeles
American entertainment industry businesspeople
American fashion businesspeople
American fashion designers
Year of birth missing (living people)
Screenwriters from California
American women television producers
American women television writers
American women fashion designers